Leidyula floridana, common name the Florida leatherleaf, is a species of tropical air-breathing land slug, shell-less terrestrial pulmonate gastropod mollusks in the family Veronicellidae.

Distribution 
This slug is native to the Caribbean (Cuba to Jamaica) and southern Florida, but has spread to northern Florida. The slug is also found in Louisiana and Texas.

 Mexico
 Nicaragua
 Cuba

References

Further reading 
Cook A. (1986) "Functional aspects of the mucus-producing glands of the Systellommatophoran slug, Veronicella floridana". Journal of Zoology 211(2): 291-305.

External links

  Leidyula floridana   on the UF / IFAS Featured Creatures Web site and photo
 drawings of anatomy of Leidyula floridana by Joseph Leidy

Veronicellidae
Gastropods described in 1851